Gerald Wexler is a Canadian film and television screenwriter. He is most noted as cowriter with Mort Ransen of the 1995 film Margaret's Museum, for which they won the Genie Award for Best Screenplay at the 16th Genie Awards in 1996.

His other credits have included episodes of the television series Urban Angel, The Smoggies, Are You Afraid of the Dark? and The Hunger, and the television films Manuel, le fils emprunté and St. Urbain's Horseman.

He was born and raised in Outremont, Quebec, and is fluently bilingual.

References

External links

Canadian male screenwriters
Canadian television writers
Writers from Montreal
Best Screenplay Genie and Canadian Screen Award winners
Living people
Year of birth missing (living people)
20th-century Canadian screenwriters
20th-century Canadian male writers
21st-century Canadian screenwriters
21st-century Canadian male writers